"Maxxie and Anwar" is the sixth episode of the first series of the British teen drama Skins. It was written by Simon Amstell and Ben Schiffer and was directed by Chris Clough. It first aired on E4 on 1 March 2007. It is told from the points of view of main characters Maxxie Oliver and Anwar Kharral.

Plot synopsis
 
Roundview Sixth Form College's Year 12 history class (and, for some reason, Tony) are going to Russia to study post-Soviet developments in the country. The class is excited to arrive, but not for the "learning experience" that teacher Tom is so enthused over, but because they are planning on a massive party, and are smuggling drugs into Russia stored in Sid's anus. As the group land in Russia, Sid gets through the metal detectors but is close to being found out by sniffer dogs. He is saved when Anwar accidentally sets off a metal detector and is forced to have a rectal inspection himself, and Tom has to pay for his release using American money which is never actually explained or even acknowledged. The day gets worse when their bus is discovered to have broken down, forcing them to hitch a ride on an open-roofed cattle wagon to their youth centre, which is an abandoned, prison-like place. To make matters even worse than this, Sid discovers he is constipated, and they are unable to get the drugs. Maxxie and Anwar share a room. Anwar is impressed by the drawings Maxxie has made of the two, but is shocked when he discovered Maxxie has drawn a picture of Anwar's penis. After Anwar makes a homophobic remark, Maxxie angrily storms off to Tony and Sid's room, requesting that he swap with Sid. Tony, sensing an opportunity to "try something new," immediately begins hitting on Maxxie, trying to get him to let him perform fellatio. Meanwhile, Anwar sees a beautiful Russian girl working outside a nearby house, and immediately call the others. By the time they arrive, though, she is not there, and they assume he is making it up. That night, Chris calls in to say goodnight to Angie, but must hide under the bed when Tom arrives and tries to impress Angie by doing squats in his underwear. After Tom falls asleep, Chris kisses Angie goodnight and leaves. At the same time, Anwar sees the Russian girl in her bedroom, this time in her underwear. She sees him through her mirror and waves.

The next morning, they are woken up by a loud bell, and are made to wash using an outside hose pipe. They are then taken to a glue factory, where they learn the hard way how glue is made. That afternoon, Maxxie, after being reminded of his conflict with Anwar by Tony, has a furious argument with him, calling Anwar a hypocrite for ignoring the rules of his religion when it suits him (his drug and alcohol abuse and lack of respect for women), but refusing to ignore his faith for his best friend. In a rage, Maxxie begins to pound walls and kick doors. He accidentally kicks one door open and is confronted by Chris and Angie having sex, causing him to hastily pull it shut in shock. Attracted by the noise, the owner of the hostel, Mrs Rynkowski, yells at him to stop, but softens when she notices how upset he is. She warms up to him greatly when she sees his Neil Diamond T-shirt, and invites him to her private quarters to share some vodka and listen to some Neil Diamond records. Meanwhile, Anwar sees the Russian girl again, but this time, so does Sid. They see that she is being hit by an older man they assume to be her father, and decide to rescue her. Jal and Michelle, bored, decide to go out to meet Russian men, and the four meet awkwardly in the hall. Michelle and Jal go to a small and gritty tavern, where they are immediately chatted up by some Russian policemen. Meanwhile, Sid and Anwar reach the house and manage to smuggle the Russian girl, whose name is Anka, back to the hostel. Sid, who did not leave in time, tries to distract the "father," only to give himself away, forcing him to flee through a nearby forest, pursued by the crazed man with a shotgun. At the hostel, Anwar discovers that Anka can speak English quite fluently, clearly having learned it from watching the American show Friends ("I learn from, like, the best American show ever! How you doin'?"), although the name of the show is never explicitly mentioned. She then persuades him to have sex with her. Tony, hearing them from his room, comes in and sees them, before running off and telling everyone else. At that moment, Sid arrives back, followed by Anka's shotgun-bearing 'father,' who she reveals is actually her husband. Realising at once that they have been having sex, the husband draws his shotgun on Anwar, but it is grabbed from him by Maxxie, who has heard the commotion from the hostel owner's quarters. After he draws a pistol, the two find themselves in a standoff, which is soon fixed when the gang of policemen Jal and Michelle met at the tavern arrive and arrest him. Jal and Michelle return, drunk, and Tom is forced to pay the fee for armed response. Anka, acting as a translator, reveals that they will also have to cut the trip short and leave the next morning for their troubles. Maxxie attempts to make amends with Anwar, who confesses to being a hypocrite, but still cannot accept Maxxie's sexuality. In his room after this, Tony hits on Maxxie again. Maxxie gives in and allows Tony to perform fellatio on him, not noticing that Michelle, who was passed out on Tony's bed, has woken up and is watching the whole thing in horror. When finished, Maxxie notes he has finally found something Tony isn't good at. The next morning on the plane, Michelle tries to get Tony to confess to having oral sex with Maxxie, but he doesn't. Sid finally begins to get over his constipation, but is informed, to his dismay, that Heathrow security is very tight, and it would be better to keep the drugs until they get through.

In a final scene, back in Russia, it emerges that the local police, Mrs. Rynkowski, Anka and her husband are all in league with each other, and the whole visit had been a scheme to swindle as much money as possible from English tourists, whom they call "rich and stupid." It is, however, revealed that Anka genuinely liked Anwar.

Cast
 Mitch Hewer as Maxxie Oliver
 Dev Patel as Anwar Kharral
 Nicholas Hoult as Tony Stonem
 Mike Bailey as Sid Jenkins
 April Pearson as Michelle Richardson
 Larissa Wilson as Jal Fazer
 Joe Dempsie as Chris Miles
 Siwan Morris as Angie

Arc significance and continuity

Anwar and Maxxie's home lives
 Anwar's parents are Pakistani. It remains unknown if Anwar is a British citizen by birth or if he emigrated to England from Pakistan.
 Anwar's mother packs his suitcase, and obviously views him as a child still (bad mood comfy jim-jams).

Series relevance
 Tony continues to push the boundaries of manipulating people by hurting both Maxxie and Michelle. Tony's cheating on Michelle with Maxxie leads to their breakup in Michelle's episode.
 Cassie does not feature in this episode, the only episode of season one which she does not appear in. This is due to being rehabilitated after attempting suicide.
 Anwar and Maxxie's friendship is abruptly ended due to Anwar's inability to accept Maxxie's open homosexuality.
 Jal tries to tell Michelle about Abigail, but Michelle doesn't want to hear it.
 Chris and Angie have sex together.
 This is the first episode told from multiple points of view. Usually when characters share episodes, their character is developed further later in the series. However, Anwar does not have a central episode at all in the next series, while Maxxie shares one with Tony.

Soundtrack
 "Easy Muffin" by Amon Tobin
 "Undenied" by Portishead
 "The Crane Wife 3" by The Decemberists
 "Gadje Sirba" by A Hawk and a Hacksaw
 "Get Your Snack On" by Amon Tobin
 "Broken Boy Soldiers" by The Raconteurs
 "Hello Again" by Neil Diamond
 "Positive Tension" by Bloc Party
 "Man of God by Neil Diamond
 "The Sparrow" by A Hawk and a Hacksaw
 "There is a River in Galisteo" by A Hawk and a Hacksaw

References

External links 
 Watch "Maxxie and Anwar" on 4od
 Maxxie & Anwar at e4.com/skins
 Skins on Internet Movie DataBase

2007 British television episodes
British LGBT-related television episodes
Skins (British TV series) episodes